The Intercontinental Final was a Motorcycle speedway Final sanctioned by the FIM as the final qualifying round for the Speedway World Championship between 1975 and 2001.

After being introduced in 1975, it replaced the European Final as the final qualifying round for Commonwealth, American and Nordic riders in 1976.

The Intercontinental Final was not run from 1991-1994 when it was replaced by the World Semi-finals. It returned to the World Championship calendar in 1995, though unlike from 1975-1991 riders would be vying for a place in the following years Speedway Grand Prix World Championship series and not for the current year World Final. 

Peter Collins (1976), Ole Olsen (1978) and Bruce Penhall (1981) are the only riders who won the Intercontinental Final to go on and win the World Championship in the same year. Collins (1977) and Erik Gundersen (1986) are the only reigning World Champions to win the Intercontinental Final.

Editions

Winners by country

See also
 Speedway World Championship
 Speedway Grand Prix
 Motorcycle speedway

References